The Dual Alliance was a defensive alliance between Germany and Austria-Hungary, which was created by treaty on October 7, 1879, as part of Germany's Otto von Bismarck's system of alliances to prevent or limit war. The two powers promised each other support in case of attack by Russia. Also, each state promised benevolent neutrality to the other if one of them was attacked by another European power (generally taken to be France, even more so after the Franco-Russian Alliance of 1894). Bismarck saw the alliance as a way to prevent the isolation of the German Empire, which had just been founded a few years before, and to preserve peace, as Russia would not wage war against both empires.

Formation
When Austria-Hungary and Germany formed an alliance in 1879, it was one of the more surprising alliances of its time.  Though both shared the German language and a similar culture, Austria-Hungary and Germany were often driven apart, most notably during the recent Austro-Prussian War. Additionally, the Habsburg rulers believed that the promotion of nationalism, which was favoured by Germany, would destroy their multinational empire. However, their common distrust of Russia brought both empires together for a common cause.

Alliance against Russia
After the formation of the German Empire in 1871, German Chancellor Otto von Bismarck wanted to portray his nation as a peacemaker and preserver of the European status quo, to gain more power for the German Empire and to unify Germany. In 1878, the Russian Empire defeated the Ottoman Empire in the Russo-Turkish War. The resulting Treaty of San Stefano gave Russia considerable influence in the Balkans, a development that outraged Austria-Hungary, Russia's chief rival in the Balkan region (despite being an ally of the Russians and the Germans in the League of the Three Emperors). Hence, in 1878, Bismarck called an international conference (the Congress of Berlin) to sort out the problem. The Treaty of Berlin that resulted from the conference reversed Russia's gains from the Treaty of San Stefano and provided the Austrians with compensation in the form of Bosnia. Despite Bismarck's attempts to play the role of an "honest broker" at the Congress of Berlin, Russo-German relations deteriorated following the conference. The Three Emperors' League was discontinued, and Germany and Austria-Hungary were free to ally against Russia.

Italy joins alliance
In 1881, Italy lost in the competition with France to establish a colony in Tunis (now Tunisia). To enlist diplomatic support, Italy joined Germany and Austria-Hungary to form the Triple Alliance in 1882, which was the first formal alliance in Europe, the second being the Triple Entente, an informal alliance, formed in 1907.

During World War I, however, Italy did not go to war immediately with its allies but stayed neutral. In 1915, it joined the Entente powers and declared war on Austria-Hungary and, in 1916, against Germany. The Dual Alliance persisted throughout the war, known as the Central Powers, and ended by their defeat in 1918.

References

Further reading
  Nicholas Der Bagdasarian, The Austro-German Rapprochement, 1872–1879: From the Battle of Sedan to the Dual Alliance (1976). online review.
 Agatha Ramm. Europe in the Nineteenth Century 1789–1905 (1984) pp. 330–341.

External links
 Translated text of the Dual Alliance

1879 in Austria-Hungary
Military alliances involving Austria-Hungary
19th-century military alliances
1879 treaties
Military alliances involving the German Empire
1879 in Germany
Austria–Germany relations
Austria-Hungary–Germany relations
October 1879 events